The Azerbaijan Regional League is  the third tier of football in the Azerbaijani football league system. Regional League is run by the Association of Football Federations of Azerbaijan (AFFA).

Teams
Azerbaijan Regional League is divided into 5 zones.

Capital and North 

Note: Table lists in alphabetical order.

Northwest and West

Centre

South 

Note: Khan Lankaran will be Khazar Lankaran FK from the 2022-23 season.

Nakhchivan

Champions

See also
 Azerbaijan Premier League
 Azerbaijan First Division
 AFFA Amateur League
 Azerbaijan Cup
 Football in Azerbaijan

References

External links
  AFFA

Third level football leagues in Europe
2017 establishments in Azerbaijan
2